Béla Zsitkovszky (3 April 1868 - 16 September 1930) was a Hungarian cinematographer and film director. Zsitkovszky was a film pioneer notable for producing the country's first ever film The Dance (A táncz) in 1901. Zsitkovszky was a cinema projectionist who was commissioned to make a film. He shot it entirely on location as Budapest lacked a film studio. In 1901 he opened the first Hungarian film laboratory.

Selected filmography
Cinematographer
 A Munkászubbony  (1914)
 Ágyú és harang (1915)
 Lyon Lea (1915)
 The Officer's Swordknot (1915)
 The Village Rogue (1916)
 The Karthauzer (1916)
 The Laughing Saskia (1916)
 Az obsitos (1917)
 Tájfun (1917)
 Tüzpróba (1918)
 Az impresszárió (1918)

References

Bibliography
 Cunningham, John. Hungarian Cinema: From Coffee House to Multiplex. Wallflower Press, 2004.
 Kulik, Karol. Alexander Korda: The Man Who Could Work Miracles''. Virgin Books, 1990.

External links

1868 births
1930 deaths
Hungarian film directors
Hungarian cinematographers